The Menuha Formation is the name given to an Upper Cretaceous (Santonian-Early Campanian) chalk, marly chalk and conglomeratic chalk unit exposed throughout the Makhtesh Ramon region of southern Israel and parts of northern Israel (Avni, 1991).

Stratigraphy and paleoenvironment 
The Menuha Formation records the earliest occurrence of tectonic activity within the Ramon anticline, forming the present erosive valley known as "Makhtesh Ramon" as an outcome of a sequence of erosive events evolving since the Late Cretaceous (Avni, 1993). It consists of white and yellow/brown chalk that is often glauconitic and sometimes conglomeratic or marly. The Menuha Formation likely represents a temperate to subtropical, open shelf environment deposited during the formation of the Ramon anticline. Reworked conglomeratic chalks in the western section represent marginal facies derived from this structural uplift.

The paleoenvironment is based on the occurrences of several shark and fish teeth, oysters, trace fossils, phosphatic peloids, and foraminiferans. The isolated teeth represent at least ten different species:
Cretalamna appendiculata
Cretoxyrhina mantelli
Squalicorax falcatus?
Squalicorax kaupi
Scapanorhynchus rapax
Scapanorhynchus raphiodon?
Carcharias samhammeri
Carcharias cf. C holmdelensis
Hadrodus priscus
Micropycnodon kansasensis?

References 

Geologic formations of Israel
Cretaceous Asia
Campanian Stage
Santonian Stage
Chalk
Conglomerate formations
Limestone formations
Marl formations
Open marine deposits